Richland Airport  is a city owned public use airport located four nautical miles (5 mi, 7 km) southeast of the central business district of Richland Center, a city in Richland County, Wisconsin, United States. Also known as Richland Center Municipal Airport,
It is included in the Federal Aviation Administration (FAA) National Plan of Integrated Airport Systems for 2021 - 2025 in which it is categorized as a basic general aviation facility.

Facilities and aircraft 
Richland Airport covers an area of 105 acres (42 ha) at an elevation of 742 feet (226 m) above mean sea level. It has two runways: 17/35 is 3,200 by 60 feet (975 x 18 m) with an asphalt surface and 9/27 is 1,500 by 100 feet (457 x 30 m) with a turf surface.

For the 12-month period ending September 26, 2022, the airport had 9,200 aircraft operations, an average of 25 per day: 98% general aviation, 1% air taxi and 1% military. In January 2023, there were 11 aircraft based at this airport: all 11 single-engine.

See also 
 List of airports in Wisconsin

References

External links 
 Richland Airport (93C) at Wisconsin DOT Airport Directory
 

Airports in Wisconsin
Buildings and structures in Richland County, Wisconsin